German submarine U-40 may refer to one of the following German submarines:

 , was a Type U 31 submarine launched in 1914 and that served in the First World War until sunk 23 June 1915
 During the First World War, Germany also had these submarines with similar names:
 , a Type UB II submarine launched in 1916 and scuttled on 5 October 1918
 , a Type UC II submarine launched in 1916 and sunk on 21 January 1919 while on way to surrender
 , a Type IX submarine that served in the Second World War until sunk on 13 October 1939

U-40 or U-XL may also refer to:
 , a  submarine of the Austro-Hungarian Navy

Submarines of Germany